Edwin J. Merrick (February 8, 1912 – June 14, 1994) was an American football coach.  He served as the head football coach at the University of Richmond from 1951 until 1965, compiling record of 53–87–6.

Merrick was inducted into the Virginia Sports Hall of Fame in 1980.

Head coaching record

College

References

1912 births
1994 deaths
American football tackles
Richmond Spiders football coaches
Richmond Spiders football players
High school football coaches in Virginia